Hadith of the Hidden Treasure is a Hadith Qudsi that has a very prominent role in Islamic mysticism and Islamic philosophy.

Different translations
The most cited version of this Hadith in Arabic is: کنت کنزاً مخفیاً فأحببت أن أعرف فخلقت الخلق لکی أعرف

It has different translations in English:
 I was a hidden treasure; I loved to be known. Hence I created the world so that I would be known
 I was a hidden treasure, and I wished to be known, so I created a creation (mankind), then made Myself known to them, and they recognised Me
 I was a Treasure unknown then I desired to be known so I created a creation to which I made Myself known; then they knew Me

This Hadith is also considered Da'if(weak) or fabricated by many Islamic scholars. [citation needed]

Sufi Cosmology 
According to Sufi cosmology, God's reason for the creation of this universe and mankind is the "manifestation" and "recognition" of Himself as it is stated in this Hadith.

In the Baháʼí Faith
Bahá'u'lláh, founder of the Baháʼí Faith, requested his son `Abdu'l-Bahá, who later became his successor, to write a commentary on the hadith of the Hidden Treasure for a Súfí leader named `Alí Shawkat Páshá. In this commentary 'Abdu'l-Bahá discusses the themes "Hidden Treasure", "Love", "Creation", and "Knowledge".

See also
 Sufi metaphysics
 Sufi philosophy

References

External links
 Sufi cosmology and psychology

Sufi philosophy
Hadith